Anti-aircraft guns are weapons designed to attack aircraft.  Such weapons commonly have a high rate of fire and are able to fire shells designed to damage aircraft.  They also are capable of firing at high angles, but are also usually able to hit ground targets as well in a direct fire role.

Towed and static anti-aircraft guns

Self-propelled anti-aircraft guns

Naval anti-aircraft guns

Citations and notes

References
Taki's Imperial Japanese Army Page
 Zaloga, Steven J., James Grandsen (1984). Soviet Tanks and Combat Vehicles of World War Two, London: Arms and Armour Press. .

 
Anti-aircraft